Heterogeneous nuclear ribonucleoproteins C1/C2 is a protein that in humans is encoded by the HNRNPC gene.

It is abnormally expressed in fetuses of both IVF and ICSI, which may contribute to the increase risk of birth defects in these ART.

Function
This gene belongs to the subfamily of ubiquitously expressed heterogeneous nuclear ribonucleoproteins (hnRNPs). The hnRNPs are RNA binding proteins and they complex with heterogeneous nuclear RNA (hnRNA). These proteins are associated with pre-mRNAs in the nucleus and appear to influence pre-mRNA processing(reference: Koenig J. nature structural and Molecular Biology 2010: iCLIP) and other aspects of mRNA metabolism and transport. While all of the hnRNPs are present in the nucleus, some seem to shuttle between the nucleus and the cytoplasm. The hnRNP proteins have distinct nucleic acid binding properties. Transcriptional regulation by hormonal 1,25-dihydroxyvitamin D(3) (calcitriol) involves occupancy of vitamin D response elements (VDREs) by HNRNPC or 1,25(OH)(2)D(3)-bound vitamin D receptor (VDR). This relationship is disrupted by elevated HNRNPC, causing a form of hereditary vitamin D-resistant rickets (HVDRR) in both humans and non-human primates. The protein encoded by this gene can act as a tetramer and is involved in the assembly of 40S hnRNP particles. Species-specific tetramerization of HNRNPC subunits is important to its nucleic acid binding, whereby over-expression of major human HNRNPC subunits in mouse osteoblastic cells confers vitamin D resistance. Multiple transcript variants encoding at least two different isoforms have been described for this gene.

Interactions
HNRNPC has been shown to interact with Grb2.

References

Further reading